Anastos is a surname. Notable people with the surname include:

 Ernie Anastos (born 1943), American television journalist
 Tom Anastos (born 1963), American ice hockey player, coach, and league administrator